John Killeen McKee (February 7, 1907 – September 7, 1978) was a Canadian politician. He served in the Legislative Assembly of New Brunswick as member of the Liberal party from 1940 to 1952. His son, Michael McKee also served in the New Brunswick Legislative Assembly.

References

1907 births
1978 deaths
New Brunswick Liberal Association MLAs